Del Mio Meglio n.4 is a compilation album released by Mina in 1977. All the tracks have been previously released, with the exception of Never Never Never, the English version of Grande Grande Grande. The song Never, Never, Never was recorded by Shirley Bassey in 1973 and was an international success; and has since been recorded, among others, by Celine Dion as a duet with Luciano Pavarotti in 1997.

Track listing

Credits
Mina – vocals
Enrico Riccardi - arranger/conductor in "Uappa"
Pino Presti – arranger/conductor in " Never Never Never (Grande grande grande)", "E penso a te", "L'importante è finire", "Don't"
Augusto Martelli – arranger/conductor in "Ma se ghe penso"
Shel Shapiro – arranger/conductor in "Immagina un concerto"
Toto Torquati – arranger/conductor in "Solo lui"
Gabriel Yared – arranger/conductor in "I giardini di marzo", "Il nostro caro angelo"
Roberto Soffici / Simon Luca – arranger/conductor in "Colpa mia"
Vince Tempera – arranger/conductor in "Caravel"
Nuccio Rinaldis – sound engineer

References

Mina (Italian singer) compilation albums
1977 compilation albums
Italian-language albums
Albums conducted by Pino Presti
Albums arranged by Pino Presti